Jon Ewo  ( born 29 June 1957) is a Norwegian novelist, short story writer, crime fiction writer and children's writer. He was born in Oslo and educated as librarian. He made his literary debut in 1986 with the short story collection Det sies at oktober er en fin måned. His crime novels include Torpedo (1996), Hevn. Torpedo II (1997) and Gissel. Torpedo III (1998).

He received the Brage Prize in 2007, for the biography Fortellingen om et mulig drap (jointly with illustrator Bjørn Ousland.

References

1957 births
Living people 
Writers from Oslo
Norwegian novelists 
Norwegian crime fiction writers 
Norwegian children's writers